Marina García Urzainqui (born 6 June 1994) is a Spanish swimmer. She was born in Barcelona. At the 2012 Summer Olympics she finished 25th overall in the heats in the Women's 100 metre breaststroke and did not reach the semifinals.

References

Swimmers from Catalonia
1994 births
Living people
Olympic swimmers of Spain
Swimmers at the 2012 Summer Olympics
Spanish female breaststroke swimmers
European Aquatics Championships medalists in swimming
Swimmers at the 2018 Mediterranean Games
Swimmers at the 2022 Mediterranean Games
Mediterranean Games silver medalists for Spain
Swimmers from Barcelona
Mediterranean Games medalists in swimming
Swimmers at the 2020 Summer Olympics
20th-century Spanish women
21st-century Spanish women